The 2000 Women's Hockey Champions Trophy was the 8th edition of the Hockey Champions Trophy for women. It was held from 26 May to 3 June 2000 in Amstelveen, Netherlands. It was held simultaneously with the men's tournament, just like the year before in Brisbane, Australia. From this year on the tournament began to be held annually until the 2014 edition due to the introduction of the World League.

The Netherlands won the tournament after 7 years for the second time after defeating Germany 3–2 in the final, ending with Australia's winning streak of 5 consecutive titles in 9 years.

Teams
The participating teams were determined by International Hockey Federation (FIH):

 (defending champions, champions of 1998 World Cup and 1996 Summer Olympics)
 (host nation)
 (third in 1998 World Cup)
 (fourth in 1998 World Cup)
 (sixth in 1998 World Cup)
 (seventh in 1998 World Cup)

Squads

Head Coach: Sergio Vigil

Head coach: Ric Charlesworth

Head Coach: Berti Rauth

Head Coach: Tom van 't Hek

Head Coach: Jan Borren

Head Coach: Gene Muller

Umpires
Below are the 9 umpires appointed by the International Hockey Federation:

Judith Barnersby (AUS)
Gill Clarke (ENG)
Renée Cohen (NED)
Marelize de Klerk (RSA)
Lyn Farrell (NZL)
Heike Malina (GER)
Alexandra Royaards (NED)
Gina Spitaleri (ITA)
Anne van Dyk (CAN)

Results
All times are Central European Summer Time (UTC+02:00)

Pool

Classification

Fifth and sixth place

Third and fourth place

Final

Awards

Statistics

Final standings

Goalscorers

References

External links
Official FIH website

Women's Hockey Champions Trophy
Champions Trophy
Hockey Champions Trophy
International women's field hockey competitions hosted by the Netherlands
Sports competitions in Amstelveen
Hockey Champions Trophy Women
Hockey Champions Trophy Women